Chondrolepis telisignata is a species of butterfly in the family Hesperiidae. It is found in central and southern Kenya, southern Tanzania, northern Malawi and Zambia.

References

Butterflies described in 1896
Hesperiinae
Butterflies of Africa
Taxa named by Arthur Gardiner Butler